Mineral economics is the academic discipline that investigates and promotes understanding of economic and policy issues associated with the production and use of mineral commodities.

Mineral economics [′min·rəl ‚ek·ə′näm·iks] is specially concerned with the analysis and understanding of mineral distribution as well as the ‘discovery, exploitation, and marketing of minerals’. Mineral economics is an academic discipline which constructs policies regarding mineral commodities and their global distribution. 

The discipline of mineral economics examines the success and the implications associated with the mining industry and the impact the industry has on the economy socially and regarding the climate. Mineral economics is a continuing, evolving field which originally started after the Second World War and has continued to expand in today's modern climate. The identification of mineral sectors and their associated total revenue from specific commodities and how this varies across Countries is significant for global trade and fecundity.  Australia is a leading export in several mineral commodities thus providing a substantial percentage of revenue within the Australian economy. Other various leaders regarding mineral trading and contributions also holds significance in understanding and forming concise parameters to apply and construct. The establishment of such findings addresses concerns regarding societal support and sustainability concerns. The sustainability of the mining industry is also a key focus and how its direct impact on the environment must be monitored and necessary parameters applied.

The history of mineral economics 
Mineral economics did not become an academic discipline until after the Second World War, with the majority of current research being completed in other disciplines and fields. Although, mineral economics has continued to develop since the 1940s by recognising the demand of such mineral commodities and the increase seen in trade globally.

From the late 1980s to early 1990s the demand of such mineral and metal products was minimal, with the perception of ’low rates of economic growth’ and ‘decline metal intensity of use’ the mineral economics sector was at risk of a ‘long-term decline’.

During the 1990s, economic transition became increasingly relevant across the globe. The proposal of foreign investment and trade, initially in response to the perceived ‘long-term decline’, promoted the demand of mineral resources and in doing so enhanced today's associated revenue of the sector.

Sustainability concerning mineral economics was first introduced and discussed in 1993. Sustainability within the mineral sector concerns the following criteria; commercially viable, consistent with social preferences for the environment and acceptable social consequences.

Mineral economics global integration 
Mineral economics is a discipline that concerns several countries globally. Global parameters and perspectives are necessary to ensure impartial diversity across sectors regarding both trading and contribution.

The Mining Contribution Index WIDER (MCI-W) ranked the Countries with the largest mining contribution in 2014. The following five Countries listed in descending order; DRC, Chile, Australia, Mongolia and Papua New Guinea are the leading Countries to attain the largest mineral contribution globally.

The impact of distributing such mineral commodities has a major affect on the economy internationally, often contributing to employment and generating income. The global demand of Mineral Economics has the potential to cause both positive and negative outcomes on society and the environment.

Implementing concise and fair access to mineral commodities was recommended by the Neighbourhood, Development and International Cooperation Instrument (NDICI) in 2021, although this recommendation has not yet been published. Creating a more renowned and inclusive mineral economy has been suggested to encourage higher sustainability of mineral economics respective to the abundance and market value of such commodities.

The mineral economics sector in Australia 
Mineral resources are an increasingly valuable commodity within Australia's mining and mineral sector. Australia's largest exports include ‘coal, oil and gas, metals, non-metals and construction materials’, and their mass distribution accounts for a substantial revenue into the Australian economy.

Mineral economics has major influence on government policies which ultimately has systematic implications for the sectors overall success and performance. The mineral economic sector has limiting factors despite the precedented revenue, specifically oil producing nations regarding ‘debt, deficits, inflation and an inefficient public sector’.

Consequently, the economic growth seen globally congregates the mineral sector to construct policies and procedures to predict both economic growth and depletion, as well as ensuring socioeconomic viable policies. Such policies also alleviates limiting factors previously mentioned, while also providing the opportunity for trends and associated revenue to be predicted and analysed which offers the potential to provide additional structures of parameters to limit inflation and deficits within the sector.

The Australian economy and its contribution 
The mineral sector is a major contributor to the Australian economy, specifically regarding its profiting revenue. The Australian mineral sector contributes ‘8 per cent of Gross Domestic Product’ into the economy. Australia's exportation of black coal, iron ore, alumina, lead and zinc is identified as the largest global distributor. Mineral commodities and their distribution does not only provide profit to distributors but also offers support socioeconomically. The Australian economy and its leading distributor status, also promotes revenue in worldwide trade through export and relations.

Despite this associated contribution, the mineral sector is ‘capital intensive’, relying heavily on machinery, which ultimately only supplements ‘2% of jobs’ within the mining sector, having minimal impact on overall economic benefit.

Foreign trade revenue attains contradictory elements also, due to the foreign stakeholders associated within the mining industry and their affiliated revenue, limiting overall economic value for Australia.

Sustainability concerns 

In today's current climate, concerns are present regarding the sustainability of mineral resources. While the mineral sector provides a substantial income into the economy seen in several leading Countries contributing to exports. Mineral economics and the associated sectors, has established concerns effecting the endurance associated with mineral exportation and its associated income.

The identification of such sustainability concerns, in relation to different sectors has been heavily discussed in recent years. Aspects such as climate change as well as the production and distribution of mineral commodities within the mining and mineral sector have been determined as significant in relation to concerns of mineral economics.

The future of mineral economics 
The future of minerals and their integration within society relies heavily on mineral economics and the policies constructed. The integration of sustainable energy supplementation reveals concerns regarding the success and future of mineral usage, however it is important to note that technological advancements can not ‘replace energy’ entirely. Despite the current concerns of mineral availability in the future and an expected decline in minerals, a precedented increase of associated costs regarding mineral commodities is precedented. This heightens the necessity of implementing technologies and sustainable practices ensuring longevity of mineral resources and sectors, through recycling mineral resources and ensuring adequate policies are constructed reflective of both trade and exports.

See also
Economic geology
Mineral resource classification

References

Further reading
 Gocht, Werner L., et al., 1988, International mineral economics: Mineral exploration, mine valuation, mineral markets, international mineral policies. Springer-Verlag, Berlin,

External links
 Mineral Economics academic journal

 
Mining engineering